Abertridwr may refer to:

Abertridwr, Powys, Wales
Abertridwr, Caerphilly, Wales
Abertridwr railway station